My Cousin Rachel is a  Gothic novel written by English author Daphne du Maurier, published in 1951. Bearing thematic similarities to her earlier and more famous novel Rebecca, it is a mystery-romance, set primarily on a large estate in Cornwall.

The story has its origins in a portrait of Rachel Carew at Antony House in Cornwall, which du Maurier saw and took as inspiration.

Plot summary
Ambrose Ashley is the owner of a large country estate on the Cornish coast and has been guardian to his orphaned cousin Philip since the latter was eighteen months old. On Sundays, Philip's godfather Nick Kendall and his daughter Louise come to lunch with them, as do the Reverend Mr Pascoe and his family. Life is good apart from a few health problems that require Ambrose to spend the winter in warmer climates. As the damp weather approaches, he sets off for his third winter abroad and chooses Italy.

By the time he has reached his 20s, Philip misses Ambrose on his sojourns in Italy but regularly receives letters from him. Ambrose writes that he has met a cousin of theirs called Rachel — the widowed Contessa Sangalletti — in Florence. In the spring, Ambrose says that he and Rachel are married and have no immediate plans to return to Cornwall. Gradually, the tone of Ambrose's correspondence changes. He complains of the sun, the stuffy atmosphere of the Villa Sangalletti, and terrible headaches. In a letter that reaches Philip in July, Ambrose says that a friend of Rachel named Rainaldi has recommended that Ambrose see a different doctor. Ambrose says he can trust no one and claims that Rachel watches him constantly.

Philip discusses the contents of the letter with his godfather Nick, who on Ambrose's death will become Philip's guardian until his coming of age at 25. Nick suggests that Ambrose may be suffering from a brain tumour. Philip travels to Italy and reaches the Villa Sangalletti, where he learns that Ambrose is dead and that Rachel has left the villa. When Philip returns to Cornwall, Nick tells Philip that he has received a communication from Rainaldi, containing two pieces of information: The death certificate confirms that Ambrose's cause of death was a brain tumour, and as Ambrose had never changed his will in Rachel's favour, Philip is still heir to the estate.

Two weeks later, Nick receives word from Rachel that she has arrived by boat at Plymouth. Philip invites her to stay with him, and a harmony develops between them. One day, a tenant from East Lodge gives Philip a letter from Ambrose, written three months before his death. In it, Ambrose tells Philip about his illness and talks of Rachel's recklessness with money and her habit of turning to Rainaldi rather than himself. Finally, he wonders if they are trying to poison him, and he asks Philip to come to see him. Rachel later shows Philip an unsigned will that Ambrose wrote, in which he leaves his property to Rachel. Philip begins to trust Rachel again.

On the day before Philip's twenty-fifth birthday, he prepares to transfer Ambrose's estate to Rachel. He also gives her the family jewels, and they make love. The next day, Philip announces that he and Rachel are getting married, but she denies this in front of friends. Not long afterward, Philip falls ill for many weeks, and Rachel nurses him. Philip searches her room and finds the seeds of the poisonous laburnum tree in a packet, a tree that he had noticed in the Italian villa. When he is well enough to go outside, he finds that the terraced gardens are complete and that work has begun on a sunken garden. The foreman tells Philip that the bridge over the garden is a framework and will not bear any weight.

Philip suspects that Rachel tried to poison him, and with Louise's help, searches her room. They find nothing to incriminate Rachel and wonder if they are misjudging her. Meanwhile, Rachel has walked to the terraced garden and stepped onto the bridge over the sunken garden. Philip finds her broken body among the timber and stone. He takes her in his arms, and she looks at him, calling him Ambrose before she dies.

The book's title reflects Philip's consistent references to Rachel as "my cousin Rachel" until the moment he realises that he is in love with her.

Adaptations

The first film adaptation, Henry Koster's My Cousin Rachel starring Richard Burton and Olivia de Havilland, was released in 1952. Du Maurier and original director George Cukor reviewed a screenplay draft and found it unfaithful to the novel, with du Maurier declaring it "Quite desperate." Nevertheless, critics Bosley Crowther and Leonard Maltin stated it was a worthy adaptation.

A four-part television adaptation, starring Christopher Guard and Geraldine Chaplin, was broadcast in 1983. Professor Nina Auerbach judged it as "superficially" more faithful, including a more complex treatment of Rachel.

A radio adaptation of My Cousin Rachel by BBC Radio 4, aired in 4 December 1993 (19:50), starring Francesca Annis and Adam Godley. It was dramatised by Bryony Lavery and directed by Claire Grove.

Another radio adaptation of My Cousin Rachel by BBC Radio 4, first aired in April 2011, starring Damian Lewis and Lia Williams. It aired again May 2013 on Radio 4's sister channel Radio 4 extra.

On 17 April 2012, a dramatic adaptation by Joseph O’Connor of My Cousin Rachel premièred at the Gate Theatre, Dublin, starring Hannah Yelland as Rachel.

Roger Michell's My Cousin Rachel, starring Rachel Weisz, Sam Claflin and Iain Glen, was released in June 2017.

Legacy
The novel is commemorated by the My Cousin Rachel Walk, which stretches five miles in the Barton lands in Cornwall, where some of the action in the novel takes place.

References

1951 British novels
British mystery novels
British novels adapted into films
British romance novels
Novels by Daphne du Maurier
Novels set in Cornwall
Victor Gollancz Ltd books
Works about cousins